RHB Bank Berhad is a Malaysian bank based in Kuala Lumpur and founded in 1994. It is one of the largest banks in Malaysia.

RHB Bank has over 180 branches in Malaysia and provides a range of banking products and services for individuals, small businesses and corporates. RHB Bank is one of the few banks in Malaysia that offers Islamic banking products and services. These products are offered through its subsidiary, RHB Islamic Bank Berhad. RHB Islamic Bank has a wide network of branches and ATMs in Malaysia and provides a range of banking products and services that are compliant with Shariah principles.

RHB Bank is listed on the Bursa Malaysia and has a market capitalisation of RM24.77 billion as of August 2022.

History

A wholly owned subsidiary of RHB Capital, RHB Bank Berhad is a result of three mergers –with Kwong Yik Bank Berhad, Sime Bank Berhad and Bank Utama (Malaysia) Berhad in 1997, 1999 and 2003. Its key milestones through the mergers are as follows:
 Kwong Yik Bank Berhad was established in 1913 in Kuala Lumpur, making it Malaya's first local bank. Amongst the bank's co-founders were Chan Wing, Cheong Yoke Choy and Loke Yew. In 1997, Kwong Yik Bank Berhad merged with DCB Bank Berhad, making it the country's biggest ever banking merger at that time.
 The United Malayan Banking Corporation Berhad ("UMBC") was set up in 1959 and subsequently became the first commercial bank to be established in independent Malaya when it was officially declared open in 1960. 
In 1996, UMBC became part of Sime Darby Berhad and was renamed Sime Bank Berhad. In 1999, it merged with RHB Bank and became part of RHB Banking Group.
 Bank Utama was incorporated in 1976. In 1998, Bank Utama merged its business operations with that of Kewangan Utama Berhad. In 2003, RHB Bank merged with Bank Utama.

Milestones – 1913 to 2017
1913: The Kwong Yik (Selangor) Banking Corporation, Limited incorporated and commenced business on 15 July 1913 at the Old Market Square. Cheong Yoke Choy was appointed the chairman of the board of directors.
1915: Moved from Market Square to the corner of Jalan Bandar and Jalan Silang where it remained until 1938.
1920s & 30s: Extended credit to local traders, mainly Chinese businessmen, miners and planters, in a financial environment largely dominated by foreign banks. Despite the economic depression of the 1930s, Kwong Yik Bank played a significant role in the growing prosperity of Malaya and the demand for rubber and tin.
1938: Moved to the Kwong Yik Bank Chambers. This remained its base until the 1960s.
1940s: Operations suspended with the Japanese Occupation and World War 2. The bank resumed business when the war ended. In 1941, deposits totalled RM5 million.
1950s: Played an integral part in the rehabilitation of the country's economy leading up to Independence. Links with overseas banks were established.
1961: Moved to its temporary premises in Jalan Bandar while awaiting the completion of its new headquarters. By this time, customer deposits totalled RM34 million.
1963: Kwong Yik Bank celebrated its Golden Jubilee.
1964: First sub-branch opened in Jalan Pasar.
1965: The landmark 10-storey Headquarters at Jalan Bandar (now Jalan Tun H.S. Lee) was opened by the Prime Minister then, Tunku Abdul Rahman on 10 September. Opened branches in Jalan Ipoh and Jalan Bukit Bintang.
1967: First branch opened in Petaling Jaya. Both Kuala Lumpur and Petaling Jaya were rapidly expanding at this point and many of the landmark buildings were financed by Kwong Yik Bank.
1968: Malayan Banking buys 30% of Kwong Yik Bank's issued capital.
1970: Malayan Banking's shareholding in the bank increased to 51.15%. Kwong Yik Bank's deposits at this juncture totalled more than RM130 million.
1970: New linear logo unveiled.
1979: Began computerizing its current and savings accounts.
April 1981: Opened a branch in Ipoh, the first outside Federal Territory and Selangor.
1985: Introduced an ATM service called 'Boss' simultaneously at 12 of its branches in Kuala Lumpur, Petaling Jaya and Klang.
1987: Joined forces with Malayan Banking to launch the country's first shared ATM service called the ABC network.
1989: Launched the Boss Corporate Card and its Sunday Banking service.
1990: MasterCard facility launched.
1993: Kwong Yik Bank celebrated its 80th anniversary. It had 50 branches throughout the country at this juncture and 1,680 staff. To mark the occasion, the bank produced its first TV commercial.
1997: Rashid Hussain Bhd purchased Malayan Banking's share in Kwong Yik Bank. The bank then merged with DCB Bank (formerly D&C Bank, established 1966), which has been under the RHB stable since 1993. This biggest bank merger in the country's history formed RHB Bank Berhad, then Malaysia's third largest financial services group.
1997: Launch of RHB Online service for financial services via computer and telephone.
1999: Sime Bank merged with RHB Bank to become part of the RHB Banking Group. Sime Bank was set up after UMBC (United Malayan Banking Corporation, established 1960) became part of the Sime Darby Group in 1996.
2003: Merger of RHB Bank with Bank Utama Berhad, which was first established in 1976.
2007: The Employees Provident Fund (EPF) emerged as the single largest shareholder of RHB Capital. 30% equity in RHB Bank was purchased from Khazanah Nasional Berhad, making RHB Bank a 100% subsidiary of RHB Capital.
2009: Inception of Easy by RHB.
2012: RHB Capital acquired OSK Investment Bank, paving the way for the RHB Banking Group's presence in ASEAN and Hong Kong. Main | RHB Cambodia
2015: Banking and financial services group RHB Capital Bhd (RHBCap) has appointed Datuk Khairussaleh Ramli  as chief executive officer and managing director with effect from May 5, 2015.
2017: Proposal merger between RHB Bank and AmBank Group.
Merger plans scrapped between RHB and Ambank Group as both parties cannot mutually agree on terms.

Strategic Business Groups (SBGs)

Retail banking
RHB offers insurance, wealth Management, hire purchase, cards and unsecured loans as well as secured loans.

Business banking

Group Transaction Banking (GTB)
RHB's Group Transaction Banking (GTB) comprises cash management, trade services and FI & correspondent banking, offering transaction-related services

Corporate and Investment Banking (CIB)
CIB offers corporate and investment banking services, comprising corporate finance advisory, equity and debt capital markets, securities and futures broking, asset management, corporate banking, private equity and research. CIB serves public-listed companies, multinationals and large corporations across all industry types.

Islamic banking
RHB Banking Group officially received the license for its Islamic banking subsidiary on 1 March 2005, making it the first commercial banking group in Malaysia to have its full-fledged Islamic bank. RHB Islamic Banking offers a range of consumer, business and corporate banking services and solutions that are Shariah-based.

Global Financial Banking
Global Financial Banking covers RHB Capital's offshore businesses, particularly its commercial banking operations in Singapore, Thailand, Brunei and Vietnam, as well as its non-Ringgit based funding operations in Labuan.

Group Treasury
Group Treasury comprises the treasury functions of commercial banks, investment banks and Islamic banks. Its major activities include managing funds, hedging and investment needs covering a wide range of treasury products and services.

References

External links

1997 establishments in Malaysia
Banks established in 1997
Banks of Malaysia
Banks of Singapore
Companies listed on Bursa Malaysia
Employees Provident Fund (Malaysia)
Government-owned companies of Malaysia
Investment banks
Malaysian brands